This is a list of dams in the watershed of the Missouri River, a tributary of the Mississippi River, in the United States. There are an estimated 17,200 dams and reservoirs in the basin, most of which are small, local irrigation structures.

Mainstem dams

Tributary dams

See also
List of tributaries of the Missouri River
Pick–Sloan Missouri Basin Program

References

Missouri River